Joe Brady (born 12 July 1982 in Coolderry, County Offaly) is an Irish Hurler.  He currently plays with his local club Coolderry GAA. He is on the Offaly Hurling Squad and captained the Coolderry 2004 Offaly Senior Hurling Championship winning team, he won 2 other titles in 2010 and 2011 and also won a Leinster title in 2011.

References

Offaly inter-county hurlers
Coolderry hurlers
1982 births
Living people